Rhéal Bélisle (July 3, 1919 – November 3, 1992) was a Canadian politician in Ontario. He was a Progressive Conservative member of the Legislative Assembly of Ontario from 1955 to 1963 who represented the northern Ontario riding of Nickel Belt. From 1963 to 1992 he was a member of the Senate.

Born in Blezard Valley, Bélisle worked as a farmer and businessman before entering politics.

He left the provincial legislature in 1963, when he was appointed to the Senate of Canada by John Diefenbaker. He served in the Senate until his death in 1992. From 1991 until his death, he was speaker pro tempore of the Senate.

External links
 
 

1919 births
1992 deaths
Canadian senators from Ontario
Franco-Ontarian people
Politicians from Greater Sudbury
Progressive Conservative Party of Ontario MPPs
Progressive Conservative Party of Canada senators